Religious responses to the problem of evil are concerned with reconciling the existence of evil and suffering with an omnipotent, omnibenevolent, and omniscient God.<ref name="Stanford"  The problem of evil is acute for monotheistic religions such as Christianity, Islam, and Judaism whose religion is based on such a God. But the question of "why does evil exist?" has also been studied in religions that are non-theistic or polytheistic, such as Buddhism, Hinduism, and Jainism.

The problem of evil is formulated as either a logic problem that highlights an inconsistency between some characteristic of God and evil, or as an evidential problem which attempts to show that evidence of evil outweighs evidence of an omnipotent, omniscient, and wholly good God. Evil in most theological discussions is defined in a broad manner as any and all pain and suffering, but religion also uses a narrow definition that says evil involves horrific acts committed by an independent moral agent and does not include all wrongs or harm including that from nature.

Logical problem of evil
Originating with Greek philosopher Epicurus, Hume summarizes Epicurus's version of the problem as follows: "Is God willing to prevent evil, but not able? Then he is not omnipotent. Is he able, but not willing? Then he is malevolent. Is he both able and willing? Then from whence comes evil?"

The logical argument from evil is as follows:
P1. If an omnipotent, omnibenevolent and omniscient god exists, then evil does not.

P2. There is evil in the world.

C1. Therefore, an omnipotent, omnibenevolent and omniscient god does not exist.

Evidential problem of evil

The evidential problem of evil (also referred to as the probabilistic or inductive version of the problem) seeks to show that the existence of evil, although logically consistent with the existence of God, counts against or lowers the probability of the truth of theism. Both absolute versions and relative versions of the evidential problems of evil are presented below.

A version by William L. Rowe:
 There exist instances of intense suffering which an omnipotent, omniscient being could have prevented without thereby losing some greater good or permitting some evil equally bad or worse.
 An omniscient, wholly good being would prevent the occurrence of any intense suffering it could, unless it could not do so without thereby losing some greater good or permitting some evil equally bad or worse.
 (Therefore) There does not exist an omnipotent, omniscient, wholly good being.

Another by Paul Draper:
 Gratuitous evils exist.
 The hypothesis of indifference, i.e., that if there are supernatural beings they are indifferent to gratuitous evils, is a better explanation for (1) than theism.
 Therefore, evidence prefers that no god, as commonly understood by theists, exists.

Christianity 
Alvin Plantinga's ultimate response to the problem of evil is that it is not a problem that can be solved. Christians simply cannot claim to know the answer to the “Why?” of evil. Plantinga stresses that this is why he does not proffer a theodicy but only a defense of theistic belief.  Philosopher Richard Swinburne also says that, in its classic form, the argument from evil is unanswerable, yet there may be still be reasons for not reaching its conclusion that there is no God. These reasons are of three kinds: other strong reasons for affirming that there is a God; general reasons for doubting the force of the argument itself; and specific reasons for doubting the criteria of any of the argument's premises.  The alleged contradictions of the problem of evil depend upon the meaning assigned to the terms involved, therefore "the most common way to resolve the problem of evil is by qualifying, redefining or supplementing one or more of the major terms".  According to John Hick, Christianity has traditionally responded within three main categories: the classic and most common Augustinian (Christological) theodicy, the Irenaean (soul making) theodicy, and process theology.

Animal suffering

In response to arguments concerning natural evil and the suffering of animals, Christopher Southgate has developed a “compound evolutionary theodicy.” Robert John Russell summarizes it as beginning with an assertion of the goodness of creation and all sentient creatures. Next Southgate argues that Darwinian evolution was the only way God could create such goodness. "A universe with the sort of beauty, diversity, sentience and sophistication of creatures that the biosphere now contains" could only come about by the natural processes of evolution. According to Russell and Southgate, the goodness of creation is intrinsically linked to the evolutionary processes by which such goodness is achieved, and these processes, in turn, inevitably come with pain and suffering as intrinsic to them. In this scenario, natural evils are an inevitable  consequence of developing life.

The Bible
There is general agreement among Bible scholars that the Bible "does not admit of a singular perspective on evil. ...Instead we encounter a variety of perspectives...  Consequently [the Bible focuses on] moral and spiritual remedies, not rational or logical [justifications]".  The Bible primarily speaks of sin as moral evil rather than natural or metaphysical evil. The writers of the Bible take the reality of a spiritual world beyond this world and its containment of hostile spiritual forces for granted. While the post-Enlightenment world does not, the "dark spiritual forces" can be seen as "symbols of the darkest recesses of human nature." Suffering and misfortune are, sometimes, represented as evil in the Bible, yet Christianity is based on "the salvific value of suffering". Theologian Brian Han Gregg says, suffering in the Bible is represented twelve different ways.

Judgment Day
John Joseph Haldane's Wittgenstinian-Thomistic account of concept formation and Martin Heidegger's observation of temporality's thrown nature imply that God's act of creation and God's act of judgment are the same act. God's condemnation of evil is subsequently believed to be executed and expressed in his created world; a judgement that is unstoppable due to God's all powerful will; a constant and eternal judgement that becomes announced and communicated to other people on Judgment Day. In this explanation, God's condemnation of evil is declared to be a good judgement.

Irenaean theodicy
The Irenaean (or soul-making) theodicy is named after the 2nd-century Greek theologian Irenaeus whose ideas were adopted in Eastern Christianity. It has been modified and advocated in the twenty-first century by John Hick. Irenaen theodicy stands in sharp contrast to the Augustinian. For Augustine, humans were created perfect but fell, and thereafter continued to choose badly of their own freewill. In Irenaeus' view, humans were not created perfect, but instead, must strive continuously to move closer to it.

The key points of a soul-making theodicy begin with its metaphysical foundation: that "(1) The purpose of God in creating the world was soul-making for rational moral agents".  (2) Humans choose their responses to the soul-making process thereby developing moral character. (3) This requires that God remain hidden, otherwise freewill would be compromised. (4) God created an epistemic distance (such that God is hidden and not immediately knowable), in part, by the presence of evil in the world, so that humans must strive to know him, and by doing so become truly good. Evil is a means to good for three main reasons:

 Means of knowledge – Hunger leads to pain, and knowledge of pain prompts humans to seek help and to help others in pain.
 Character building – Evil offers the opportunity to grow morally. "We would never learn the art of goodness in a world designed as a hedonistic paradise" (Richard Swinburne)
 Predictable environment – The world runs to a series of natural laws. These are independent of any inhabitants of the universe. Natural Evil only occurs when these natural laws conflict with our own perceived needs. This is not immoral in any way

(5) The distance of God makes moral freedom possible, while the existence of obstacles makes meaningful struggle possible. (6) The result of beings who complete the soul-making process is "a good of such surpassing value" that it justifies the means. (7) Those who complete the process will be admitted to the kingdom of God where there will be no more evil. Hick argues that, for suffering to have soul-making value, "human effort and development must be present at every stage of existence including the afterlife".

Augustinian theodicy
St Augustine of Hippo (354–430 CE) grappled with the problem of evil before and after his conversion. After converting to Christianity, he came to view God as a spiritual, not corporeal, Being who is sovereign over other lesser beings based on God having created all material reality ex nihilo. Augustine's view of evil relies on the causal principle that every cause is superior to its effects. God is innately superior to his creation, and everything that God creates is good." Every creature is good, but "some are better than others (De nat. boni c. Man.14)". However, created beings also have tendencies toward mutability and corruption because they were created out of nothing. They are subject to the prejudices that come from personal perspective: humans care about what affects themselves, and fail to see how their privation might contribute to the common good. For Augustine, evil, when it refers to God's material creation, refers to a "privation, an absence of goodness "where goodness might have been" (Conf.3.7.12)".  This absence of good is an act of the  will, "a culpable rejection of the infinite bounty God offers in favor of an infinitely inferior fare", freely chosen by the will of an individual.

St. Thomas Aquinas
Saint Thomas Aquinas systematized the Augustinian conception of evil, supplementing it with his own musings. Evil, according to St. Thomas, is a privation, or the absence of some good which belongs properly to the nature of the creature. There is, therefore, no ontological source of evil, corresponding to the greater good, which is God; evil being not real but rational—i.e. it exists not as an objective fact, but as a subjective conception; things are evil not in themselves, but because of their relation to other items or persons. All realities are in themselves functional; they produce bad results only incidentally; and consequently, the final cause of evil is fundamental 'goodness,' as well as the objects in which evil is found.

Luther and Calvin 

Both Luther and Calvin explained evil as a consequence of the fall of man and the original sin. Calvin, however, held to the belief in predestination and omnipotence, the fall is part of God's plan. Luther saw evil and original sin as an inheritance from Adam and Eve, passed on to all mankind from their conception and bound the will of man to serving sin, which God's just nature allowed as consequence for their distrust, though God planned mankind's redemption through Jesus Christ. Ultimately humans may not be able to understand and explain this plan.

Liberal Christianity 
Some modern liberal Christians, including French Calvinist theologian André Gounelle and Pastor Marc Pernot of L'Oratoire du Louvre, believe that God is not omnipotent, and that the Bible only describes God as "almighty" in passages concerning the End Times.

Alvin Plantinga
Augustine's theodicy of the fourth century includes free will, but the contemporary version is best represented by Alvin Plantinga. Plantinga offers a free will defense, instead of a theodicy. Plantinga begins with the Leibnizian supposition that there were innumerable possible worlds, some with moral good but no moral evil, available to God before creation. We live in the actual world (the world God actualized), but God could have chosen to create (actualize) any of the possibilities. The catch, Plantinga says, is that it is possible that factors within the possible worlds themselves prevented God from actualizing any of those worlds with moral goodness and no moral evil. Plantinga refers to these factors as the nature of "human essences" and “transworld depravity".

Across the various possible worlds (transworld) are all the variations of possible humans, each with their own "human essence" (identity): core properties essential to each person that makes them who they are and distinguishes them from others. Every person is the instantiation of such an essence. This "transworld identity" varies in details but not in essence from world to world. This might include variations of a person (X) who always chooses right in some worlds. If somewhere, in some world, (X) ever freely chooses wrong, then the other possible worlds of only goodness could not be actualized and still leave (X) fully free. There might be numerous possible worlds which contained (X) doing only morally good things, but these would not be worlds that God could bring into being, because (X) effectively eliminated those options through free action in other possible worlds. (X)'s free choice determined the world available for God to create.

An all knowing God would know "in advance" that there are times when "no matter what circumstances” God places (X) in, as long as God leaves (X) free, (X) will make at least one bad choice. Plantinga terms this "transworld depravity".  Therefore, if God wants (X) to be a part of creation, and free, then it could mean that the only option such a God would have would be to have an (X) who goes wrong at least once in a world where such wrong is possible. "What is important about transworld depravity is that if a person suffers from it, then it wasn’t within God’s power to actualize any world in which that person is significantly free but does no wrong". Plantinga extends this to all human agents noting, "clearly it is possible that everybody suffers from transworld depravity". This means creating a world with moral good, no moral evil, and truly free persons was not an option available to God. The only way to have a world free of moral evil would be “by creating one without significantly free persons".

Christian Science

Christian Science views evil as having no ultimate reality and as being due to false beliefs, consciously or unconsciously held. Evils such as illness and death may be banished by correct understanding. This view has been questioned, aside from the general criticisms of the concept of evil as an illusion discussed earlier, since the presumably correct understanding by Christian Science members, including the founder, has not prevented illness and death. However, Christian Scientists believe that the many instances of spiritual healing (as recounted e.g. in the Christian Science periodicals and in the textbook Science and Health with Key to the Scriptures by Mary Baker Eddy) are anecdotal evidence of the correctness of the teaching of the unreality of evil. According to one author, the denial by Christian Scientists that evil ultimately exists neatly solves the problem of evil; however, most people cannot accept that solution

Jehovah's Witnesses
Jehovah's Witnesses believe that Satan is the original cause of evil. Though once a perfect angel, Satan developed feelings of self-importance and craved worship, and eventually challenged God's right to rule. Satan caused Adam and Eve to disobey God, and humanity subsequently became participants in a challenge involving the competing claims of Jehovah and Satan to universal sovereignty. Other angels who sided with Satan became demons.

God's subsequent tolerance of evil is explained in part by the value of free will. But Jehovah's Witnesses also hold that this period of suffering is one of non-interference from God, which serves to demonstrate that Jehovah's "right to rule" is both correct and in the best interests of all intelligent beings, settling the "issue of universal sovereignty". Further, it gives individual humans the opportunity to show their willingness to submit to God's rulership.

At some future time known to him, God will consider his right to universal sovereignty to have been settled for all time. The reconciliation of "faithful" humankind will have been accomplished through Christ, and nonconforming humans and demons will have been destroyed. Thereafter, evil (any failure to submit to God's rulership) will be summarily executed.

The Church of Jesus Christ of Latter-day Saints 
The Church of Jesus Christ of Latter-day Saints (LDS Church) introduces a concept similar to Irenaean theodicy, that experiencing evil is a necessary part of the development of the soul. Specifically, the laws of nature prevent an individual from fully comprehending or experiencing good without experiencing its opposite. In this respect, Latter-day Saints do not regard the fall of Adam and Eve as a tragic, unplanned cancellation of an eternal paradise; rather they see it as an essential element of God's plan. By allowing opposition and temptations in mortality, God created an environment for people to learn, to develop their freedom to choose, and to appreciate and understand the light, with a comparison to darkness

This is a departure from the mainstream Christian definition of omnipotence and omniscience, which Latter-day Saints believe was changed by post-apostolic theologians in the centuries after Christ. The writings of Justin Martyr, Origen, Augustine, and others indicate a merging of Christian principles with Greek metaphysical philosophies such as Neoplatonism, which described divinity as an utterly simple, immaterial, formless substance/essence (ousia) that was the absolute causality and creative source of all that existed. Latter-day Saints believe that through modern day revelation, God restored the truth about his nature, which eliminated the speculative metaphysical elements that had been incorporated after the Apostolic era. As such, God's omniscience/omnipotence is not to be understood as metaphysically transcending all limits of nature, but as a perfect comprehension of all things within nature—which gives God the power to bring about any state or condition within those bounds. This restoration also clarified that God does not create Ex nihilo (out of nothing), but uses existing materials to organize order out of chaos. Because opposition is inherent in nature, and God operates within nature's bounds, God is therefore not considered the author of evil, nor will He eradicate all evil from the mortal experience. His primary purpose, however, is to help His children to learn for themselves to both appreciate and choose the right, and thus achieve eternal joy and live in his presence, and where evil has no place.

Contemporary post-Holocaust theodicy 
Contemporary theodicy takes one, or some combination, of four general approaches to addressing the problem of evil, (five if one counts the anti-theodicy position as a theodicy). The first can be called the protological approach. It asserts God's decisions and actions at creation are reconcilable with omni-benevolence, despite the many and often horrendous evils that have come as a result. Alvin Plantinga, Richard Swinburne, and Eleonore Stump have markedly different theodicies but all have their primary focus on "God as maker of Heaven and earth" doing the best, most loving thing by creating humans and the world as it exists. David Ray Griffin and John Hick also have substantial protological elements in their theodicies.

Jürgen Moltmann, René Girard, Pope John Paul II, Marilyn McCord Adams, and James Cone all have versions of the traditional Christological (aka cruciform) approach to the problem of evil. John Paul and Adams speak of the “horrors” of existence becoming "secure points of identification with the crucified God".  Moltmann says Jesus' suffering was so profound it changed God, just as profound suffering changes the humans who endure it. René Girard's "unique claim is that Christ’s death has once-and-for-all unmasked the cycle of violence and victimization that has existed 'since the foundation of the world'." Black theologian James Cone says that, through Jesus' immersion in human suffering, God's identity is found among those who suffer.

The enestological solution is based in process theology, stresses the ongoing presence of God as a benevolent providence who constantly works to persuade human beings to choose good, but does not unilaterally intervene to force them as a despot would. It has become a particularly influential view in the contemporary period through the work of a number of feminist and womanist theologians, such as Wendy Farley and Cheryl Kirk-Duggan, as well as to the majority of those who hold to the “anti-theodicy” position such as Sarah Pinnock. Marjorie Suchocki and John Hick use process theology to emphasize the "here and now" of God while also having strong protological and eschatological elements in their approaches, but it was David Griffin's book God, Power, and Evil in 2004 that was the first “full-scale treatment of the problem of evil written from the perspective of ‘process’ philosophical and theological thought".  Griffin builds on Whitehead's view that God is not alone in having "power, creativity, and self-determination" asserting that "God has no hands but our hands".

Marjorie Suchocki asserts the need of an eschatological aspect for creating a complete Christian theodicy. Yet, the willingness to include an eschatology at all is a minority view among the writers of contemporary theodicy mentioned here. Most agree that "eschatology should be clearly de-emphasized, if not bypassed altogether" as an afterlife cannot be used to justify or explain suffering in this life.  Yet, the eschatological approach has been the particular focus and emphasis of John Hick's writings.

Hick asserts that, “the question of immortality ... is an essential basis for any view which could count towards a solution of the theological problem of human suffering.” Hick holds that moral goodness is only gradually achieved and that, because it is obtained through suffering and struggle, it is of greater value than a preprogrammed virtue God might have enacted at creation. For Hick, this soul-making must continue after death, and he adamantly holds to the doctrine of universal salvation. Universal salvation/reconciliation has long been a heavily debated minority view in the West, but it was the common soteriology until Augustine's competing theory of eternal damnation of the fourth century. Hick references the earlier view found in the writings of Irenaeus, and in other Eastern writers including Origen and Gregory of Nyssa, arguing that “eternal pain [and] unending torment” would render any “Christian theodicy impossible" as it would instantiate an evil that was able to thwart God's benevolence and power.

A. K. Anderson advocates a maximal Christian theodicy which integrates the strengths of all four approaches, since he sees them all as, separately, inadequate. "With Plantinga we have a Creator God, but not much else, while Hick adds to this God’s relation to the end time, but leaves the Divine distant, both epistemically and otherwise, from what takes place between the beginning and the eschaton. Cone and Soelle correct this tendency of Hick’s, but have their own reverse omissions, as they both find the Divine first and foremost in the person of Jesus, and secondarily in the ongoing struggle against injustice he inspires, yet they bypass serious consideration of creation and an afterlife. Griffin meanwhile has an enestological theodicy with a protological component, but in his work Christology and eschatology are unable to find any significant place at the table".

Finally, James Wetzel writes that Kenneth Surin is representative of an increasing anti-theodicy backlash. For those writing theodicy in the twenty-first century, there is no seamless theory that provides all answers, nor do these contemporary theologians think there should be. "When one considers human lives that have been shattered to the core, and, in the face of these tragedies [addresses] the question “Where is God?” ... we would do well to stand with [poet and Holocaust survivor] Nelly Sachs as she says, 'We really don't know'.” Contemporary theodiceans, such as Alvin Plantinga, describe having doubts about the enterprise of theodicy, "in the sense of providing an explanation of precise reasons why there is evil in the world". Instead, they attempt to articulate a defense of theistic belief as logical in the face of remaining questions. For example, Sarah Pinnock asserts that: "Direct contact with God does not answer Job's questions, but it makes meaning, and the acceptance of suffering, possible".

Wetzel says, Surin distinguishes theoretical theodicy from a practical theodicy that needs to be more concerned with eliminating evil than explaining it and replaces "philosophy's abstract and impassable God [a God who cannot change and therefore doesn't suffer] with a God who suffers". Dorothy Soelle, Jürgen Moltmann and P. T. Forsyth are in this group.

Islam
Islamic scholars in the medieval and modern era have tried to reconcile the problem of evil with the afterlife theodicy. According to Nursi, the temporal world has many evils such as the destruction of Ottoman Empire and its substitution with secularism, and such evils are impossible to understand unless there is an afterlife. The omnipotent, omniscient, omnibenevolent God in Islamic thought creates everything, including human suffering and its causes (evil). Evil was neither bad nor needed moral justification from God, but rewards awaited believers in the afterlife. The faithful suffered in this short life, so as to be judged by God and enjoy heaven in the never-ending afterlife.

Alternate theodicies in Islamic thought include the 11th-century Ibn Sina's denial of evil in a form similar to "privation theory" theodicy. However, this theodicy attempt by Ibn Sina is considered, by Shams C. Inati, as unsuccessful because it implicitly denies the omnipotence of God.

Judaism

The Bible
According to Jon Levenson, the writers of the Hebrew Bible were well aware of evil as a theological problem, but there is no evidence of awareness of the problem of evil. In contrast, according to Yair Hoffman, the ancient books of the Hebrew Bible do not show an awareness of the theological problem of evil, and even most later biblical scholars did not touch the question of the problem of evil.

In the Bible, all characterizations of evil and suffering assert the view of "a God who is greater than suffering [who] is powerful, creative and committed to His creation [who] always has the last word"; God's commitment to the greater good is assumed in all cases. In the Hebrew Bible, Genesis says God's creation is "good" with evil depicted as entering creation as a result of human choice. The book of Job "seeks to expand the understanding of divine justice ...beyond mere retribution, to include a system of divine sovereignty [showing] the King has the right to test His subject's loyalty... [Job] corrects the rigid and overly simplistic doctrine of retribution in attributing suffering to sin and punishment."

Hebrew Bible scholar Marvin A. Sweeney says "...a unified reading of [Isaiah] places the question of theodicy at the forefront... [with] three major dimensions of the question: Yahweh's identification with the conqueror, Yahweh's decree of judgment against Israel without possibility of repentance, and the failure of Yahweh's program to be realized by the end of the book." Ezekiel and Jeremiah confront the concept of personal moral responsibility and understanding divine justice in a world under divine governance.  "Theodicy in the Minor Prophets differs little from that in Isaiah, Jeremiah and Ezekiel."  In the Psalms more personal aspects of theodicy are discussed, such as Psalm 73 which confronts the internal struggle created by suffering.  Theodicy in the Hebrew Bible almost universally looks "beyond the concerns of the historical present to posit an eschatological salvation" at that future time when God restores all things.

Tradition and philosophy
The earliest awareness of the problem of evil in Jewish tradition is evidenced in extra- and post-biblical sources such as early Apocrypha (secret texts by unknown authors, which were not considered mainstream at the time they were written). The first systematic reflections on the problem of evil by Jewish philosophers is traceable only in the medieval period.

The 10th-century Rabbi called Saadia Gaon presented a theodicy along the lines of "soul-making, greater good and afterlife". Suffering suggested Saadia, in a manner similar to Babylonian Talmud Berakhot 5, should be considered as a gift from God because it leads to an eternity of heaven in afterlife. In contrast, the 12th-century Moses Maimonides offered a different theodicy, asserting that the all-loving God neither produces evil nor gifts suffering, because everything God does is absolutely good, then presenting the "privation theory" explanation. Both these answers, states Daniel Rynhold, merely rationalize and suppress the problem of evil, rather than solve it. It is easier to rationalize suffering caused by a theft or accidental injuries, but the physical, mental and existential horrors of persistent events of repeated violence over long periods of time such as Holocaust, or an innocent child slowly suffering from the pain of cancer, cannot be rationalized by one sided self blame and belittling a personhood. Attempts by theologians to reconcile the problem of evil, with claims that the Holocaust evil was a necessary, intentional and purposeful act of God have been declared obscene by Jewish thinkers such as Richard Rubenstein.

The problem of evil gained renewed interest among Jewish scholars after the moral evil of the Holocaust; the all-powerful, all-compassionate, all-knowing monotheistic God presumably had the power to prevent the Holocaust, but he did not. The Jewish thinkers have argued that either God did not care about the torture and suffering in the world He created—which means He is not omnibenevolent, or He did not know what was happening—which means He is not omniscient. The persecution of Jewish people was not a new phenomenon, and medieval Jewish thinkers had in abstract attempted to reconcile the logical version of the problem of evil. The Holocaust experience and other episodes of mass extermination such as the Gulag and the Killing Fields where millions of people experienced torture and died, however, brought into focus the visceral nature of the evidential version of the problem of evil.

Jewish theodicy continues to experience extensive revision while continuing to assert the difference between the human and divine perspective of evil; it remains rooted in the nature of creation itself and the limitation inherent in matter's capacity to be perfected; and the action of freewill includes the potential for perfection from individual effort and leaves evil in human hands.

Other religions

Ancient Mesopotamia and Egypt
Further, the Pharaoh was seen as an agent of the gods and his actions as a king were aimed to prevent evil and curb evilness in human nature.

Ancient Greek religion
The gods in Ancient Greek religion were seen as superior, but shared similar traits with humans and often interacted with them. Although the Greeks didn't believe in any "evil" gods, the Greeks still acknowledged the fact that evil was present in the world. Gods often meddled in the affairs of men, and sometimes their actions consisted of bringing misery to people, for example gods would sometimes be a direct cause of death for people. However, the Greeks did not consider the gods to be evil as a result of their actions, instead the answer for most situations in Greek mythology was the power of fate. Fate is considered to be more powerful than the gods themselves and for this reason no one can escape it. For this reason the Greeks recognized that unfortunate events were justifiable by the idea of fate.

Later Greek and Roman theologians and philosophers discussed the problem of evil in depth. Starting at least with Plato, philosophers tended to reject or de-emphasize literal interpretations of mythology in favor of a more pantheistic, natural theology based on reasoned arguments. In this framework, stories that seemed to impute dishonorable conduct to the gods were often simply dismissed as false, and as being nothing more than the "imagination of poets."  Greek and Roman thinkers continued to wrestle, however, with the problems of natural evil and of evil that we observe in our day-to-day experience.  Influential Roman writers, such as Cicero (De Natura Deorum) and Seneca (De Providentia), drawing on earlier work by the Greek philosophers such as the Stoics, developed many arguments in defense of the righteousness of the gods.

On the other hand, the philosopher Lucretius in De rerum natura, rejected the divinity in nature as a cause of many evils for humanity.

Buddhism
Buddhism accepts that there is evil in the world, as well as Dukkha (suffering) that is caused by evil or because of natural causes (aging, disease, rebirth). Evil is expressed in actions and state of mind such as cruelty, murder, theft and avarice, which are a result of the three poisons: greed, hatred, and delusion. The precepts and practices of Buddhism, such as Four Noble Truths and Noble Eightfold Path aim to empower a follower in gaining insights and liberation (nirvana) from the cycle of such suffering as well as rebirth.

Some strands of Mahayana Buddhism developed a theory of Buddha-nature in texts such as the Tathagata-garbha Sutras composed in 3rd-century south India, which is very similar to the "soul, self" theory found in classical Hinduism. The Tathagata-garbha theory leads to a Buddhist version of the problem of evil, states Peter Harvey, because the theory claims that every human being has an intrinsically pure inner Buddha which is good. This premise leads to the question as to why anyone does any evil, and why doesn't the "intrinsically pure inner Buddha" attempt or prevail in preventing the evil actor before he or she commits the evil. One response has been that the Buddha-nature is omnibenevolent, but not omnipotent. Further, the Tathagata-garbha Sutras are atypical texts of Buddhism, because they contradict the Anatta doctrines in a vast majority of Buddhist texts, leading scholars to posit that the Tathagatagarbha Sutras were written to promote Buddhism to non-Buddhists, and that they do not represent mainstream Buddhism.

Mainstream Buddhism, since its early development, did not need to address a theological problem of evil as it saw no need for a creator of the universe and asserted instead, like many Indian traditions, that the universe never had a beginning and all existence is an endless cycle of rebirths (samsara).

Hinduism

Hinduism is a complex religion with many different currents or religious beliefs Its non-theist traditions such as Samkhya, early Nyaya, Mimamsa and many within Vedanta do not posit the existence of an almighty, omnipotent, omniscient, omnibenevolent God (monotheistic God), and the classical formulations of the problem of evil and theodicy do not apply to most Hindu traditions. Further, deities in Hinduism are neither eternal nor omnipotent nor omniscient nor omnibenevolent. Devas are mortal and subject to samsara. Evil as well as good, along with suffering is considered real and caused by human free will, its source and consequences explained through the karma doctrine of Hinduism, as in other Indian religions.

A version of the problem of evil appears in the ancient Brahma Sutras, probably composed between 200 BCE and 200 CE, a foundational text of the Vedanta tradition of Hinduism. Its verses 2.1.34 through 2.1.36 aphoristically mention a version of the problem of suffering and evil in the context of the abstract metaphysical Hindu concept of Brahman. The verse 2.1.34 of Brahma Sutras asserts that inequality and cruelty in the world cannot be attributed to the concept of Brahman, and this is in the Vedas and the Upanishads. In his interpretation and commentary on the Brahma Sutras, the 8th-century scholar Adi Shankara states that just because some people are happier than others and just because there is so much malice, cruelty and pain in the world, some state that Brahman cannot be the cause of the world.

Shankara attributes evil and cruelty in the world to Karma of oneself, of others, and to ignorance, delusion and wrong knowledge, but not to the abstract Brahman. Brahman itself is beyond good and evil. There is evil and suffering because of karma. Those who struggle with this explanation, states Shankara, do so because of presumed duality, between Brahman and Jiva, or because of linear view of existence, when in reality "samsara and karma are anadi" (existence is cyclic, rebirth and deeds are eternal with no beginning). In other words, in the Brahma Sutras, the formulation of problem of evil is considered a metaphysical construct, but not a moral issue.  Ramanuja of the theistic Sri Vaishnavism school—a major tradition within Vaishnavism—interprets the same verse in the context of Vishnu, and asserts that Vishnu only creates potentialities.

According to Swami Gambhirananda of Ramakrishna Mission, Sankara's commentary explains that God cannot be charged with partiality or cruelty (i.e. injustice) on account of his taking the factors of virtuous and vicious actions (Karma) performed by an individual in previous lives. If an individual experiences pleasure or pain in this life, it is due to virtuous or vicious action (Karma) done by that individual in a past life.

A sub-tradition within the Vaishnavism school of Hinduism that is an exception is dualistic Dvaita, founded by Madhvacharya in the 13th-century. This tradition posits a concept of God so similar to Christianity, that Christian missionaries in colonial India suggested that Madhvacharya was likely influenced by early Christians who migrated to India, a theory that has been discredited by scholars.Sarma 2000, pp. 19–21. Madhvacharya was challenged by Hindu scholars on the problem of evil, given his dualistic Tattvavada theory that proposed God and living beings along with universe as separate realities. Madhvacharya asserted, Yathecchasi tatha kuru, which Sharma translates and explains as "one has the right to choose between right and wrong, a choice each individual makes out of his own responsibility and his own risk".Sharma 1962, p. 361. Madhva's reply does not address the problem of evil, state Dasti and Bryant, as to how can evil exist with that of a God who is omnipotent, omniscient, and omnibenevolent.

According to Sharma, "Madhva's tripartite classification of souls makes it unnecessary to answer the problem of evil". According to David Buchta, this does not address the problem of evil, because the omnipotent God "could change the system, but chooses not to" and thus sustains the evil in the world. This view of self's agency of Madhvacharya was, states Buchta, an outlier in Vedanta school and Indian philosophies in general.

Previous lives and karma
The theory of karma refers to the spiritual principle of cause and effect where intent and actions of an individual (cause) influence the future of that individual (effect). The problem of evil, in the context of karma, has been long discussed in Indian religions including Buddhism, Hinduism and Jainism, both in its theistic and non-theistic schools; for example, in Uttara Mīmāṃsā Sutras Book 2 Chapter 1; the 8th-century arguments by Adi Sankara in Brahmasutrabhasya where he posits that God cannot reasonably be the cause of the world because there exists moral evil, inequality, cruelty and suffering in the world; and the 11th-century theodicy discussion by Ramanuja in Sribhasya.

Many Indian religions place greater emphasis on developing the karma principle for first cause and innate justice with Man as focus, rather than developing religious principles with the nature and powers of God and divine judgment as focus. Karma theory of Buddhism, Hinduism and Jainism is not static, but dynamic wherein livings beings with intent or without intent, but with words and actions continuously create new karma, and it is this that they believe to be in part the source of good or evil in the world. These religions also believe that past lives or past actions in current life create current circumstances, which also contributes to either. Other scholars suggest that nontheistic Indian religious traditions do not assume an omnibenevolent creator, and some theistic schools do not define or characterize their god(s) as monotheistic Western religions do and the deities have colorful, complex personalities; the Indian deities are personal and cosmic facilitators, and in some schools conceptualized like Plato's Demiurge. Therefore, the problem of theodicy in many schools of major Indian religions is not significant, or at least is of a different nature than in Western religions.

According to Arthur Herman, karma-transmigration theory solves all three historical formulations to the problem of evil while acknowledging the theodicy insights of Sankara and Ramanuja.

Notes and references

Notes

References

External links
 
 Faith in the Face of Evil, Appendix VI of Kant's Critical Religion, by Stephen Palmquist.

Encyclopedias 
 
 
 
 EvilThe Catholic Encyclopedia

Arguments for the existence of God
Christian philosophy
Christian apologetics
Jewish philosophy